The Nordic Children's Book Prize (Danish: Nordisk Skolebibliotekarforenings Børnebogspris also called Nordisk Børnebogspris) is a children's literary prize which was established in 1985 by the Nordic Association of School Librarians (Nordisk Skolebibliotekarforening). The winners received an amount of money and a diploma.

The award was superseded by the Nordic Council Children and Young People's Literature Prize.

The Winners of the Nordic Children's Book Prize

References 

Nordic literary awards
Children's literary awards